Jatike  is a village in Kapurthala district of Punjab State, India.

Demography 
According to the report published by Census India in 2011, Jatike has a total number of 190 houses and population of 946 of which include 493 males and 453 females.

Caste  
The village has schedule caste (SC) constitutes 30.44% of total population of the village and it doesn't have any Schedule Tribe (ST) population.

Work activity
As per census 2011, 317 people were engaged in Main work activities out of the total population of Jatike  which includes 286 males and 31 females. According to census survey report 2011, 96.85% workers describe their work as main work and 3.15% workers are involved in Marginal activity providing livelihood for less than 6 months.  Of 317 workers engaged in Main Work, 124 were cultivators (owner or co-owner) while 90 were Agricultural labourers.

Administration
The village is administrated by a Sarpanch who is an elected representative of village as per constitution of India and Panchayati raj (India).

Air travel connectivity 
The closest airport to the village is Sri Guru Ram Dass Jee International Airport.

Villages in Kapurthala

References

External links
  Villages in Kapurthala
 Kapurthala Villages List

Villages in Kapurthala district